Sand is a 1949 American Western film directed by Louis King and starring Mark Stevens and Coleen Gray. It was nominated at the 22nd Academy Awards for Best Cinematography (color)-which Charles G. Clarke was nominated for.

Plot
Based on the 1932 novel of the same name, Jeff Keane's expensive show horse escapes and runs loose in the Colorado wilderness.

Cast
 Mark Stevens as Jeff Keane
 Coleen Gray as Joan Hartley
 Rory Calhoun as Chick Palmer
 Charley Grapewin as Doug
 Robert Patten as Boyd (as Bob Patten)

References

External links
 
 
 

1949 Western (genre) films
1949 films
20th Century Fox films
Films about horses
Films directed by Louis King
Films based on American novels
Films produced by Darryl F. Zanuck
Films scored by Daniele Amfitheatrof
American Western (genre) films
1940s American films